Athena Mae Duarte Imperial-Rodriguez (born February 2, 1987) is a Filipino news field reporter, communication researcher and beauty queen. She competed in the eleventh edition of the national Miss Philippines Earth beauty pageant where she emerged as the winner and was crowned Miss Philippines Earth 2011. She was crowned Miss Earth-Water 2011 during the coronation night of the Miss Earth 2011 pageant held in the Philippines.

Personal life and career
Imperial was born on February 2, 1987, in Legazpi City, Albay, but grew up in Casiguran, Aurora. She is the eldest child of Angel Imperial, a Philippine National Food Authority employee, and the former Mercy Duarte, a housewife. Formerly, she worked as a researcher and writer for GMA television network's investigative news magazine show, Reporter's Notebook. She is a news anchor and senior correspondent at GMA News TV.

On April 2, 2018, Imperial married stock market advocate Ben Rodriguez.

Pageantry

Miss Philippines Earth 2011
Imperial joined and represented Casiguran, Aurora in the national Miss Philippines Earth 2011. She was one of the initial 50 candidates, and after a series of four eliminations, she was announced as one of the final 10 finalists during the talent and cultural costume competitions at Thunderbird Resorts in Binangonan, Rizal.

In the final competition of the Miss Philippines Earth 2011, she competed and achieved one of the five highest scores in the swimsuit, and evening gown competitions for her stage chops and question and answer portion of the pageant. At the conclusion of the pageant, she won and was crowned Miss Philippines Earth 2011. She was crowned by the outgoing Miss Philippines Earth 2011 titleholder, Psyche Resus on June 5, 2011, at the Puerto Princesa City Coliseum in Palawan. She also won the People's Choice award.

After her feat in the Miss Philippines Earth pageant, the governor of the Philippine province of Aurora remarked that Imperial would someday follow in her footsteps as governor and said: "Every time I heard her speak, I told myself one day she will become governor of Aurora," because Imperial has a good political persona and given that she is a graduate of the country's premiere school, the University of the Philippines, where the Angaras had learned the hard knocks of life.

Miss Earth 2011
Imperial finished third place during the coronation night of the Miss Earth 2011 beauty pageant held December 3, 2011, at the University of the Philippines Theater, Diliman, Quezon City. She was crowned Miss Earth - Water.

See also

Cathy Untalan
Diane Querrer
Emma Tiglao
Ganiel Krishnan
Tina Marasigan

References

External links
 Official Miss Earth website
 Miss Earth Foundation website

Living people
1987 births
Miss Philippines Earth winners
Mutya ng Pilipinas contestants
Miss Earth 2011 contestants
GMA Integrated News and Public Affairs people
People from Legazpi, Albay
Filipino television journalists
University of the Philippines alumni
Women television journalists